Leaf is a census-designated place and unincorporated community in Greene County, Mississippi, United States.

Leaf is located east of Leaf River Wildlife Management Area, within the eastern boundary of De Soto National Forest.

The town is named for the Leaf River, which flows a few miles east.

It was first named as a CDP in the 2020 Census which listed a population of 62.

History
Leaf was settled in 1838, and originally called "Salem".  Most of the early settlers in the region were Irish, Scottish or English, and Salem's first families were the Thomsons, Cowarts, McKays, and McLeods.

Salem Academy was founded by W.W. Thompson, and operated between 1845 and 1862.  Thompson later served as a Superintendent of Education of Greene County.

Leaf was a stop on the Mobile, Jackson and Kansas City Railroad, which later became the Illinois Central Railroad.

In 1902, three partners bought two sawmills in Leaf, as well as carts, oxen and wagons, and opened the Thomson Brothers Lumber Company. Green operated the mill under the named W.F. Green Lumber Company. The sawmill was destroyed by fire in 1906, at a loss of $20,000. The mill was rebuilt, but its operations ceased in 1909 when W.F. Green moved to Hattiesburg, Mississippi.

A post office operated under the name Leaf from 1874 to 1986.

Demographics

2020 census

Note: the US Census treats Hispanic/Latino as an ethnic category. This table excludes Latinos from the racial categories and assigns them to a separate category. Hispanics/Latinos can be of any race.

Notable people
 Lloyd Green, steel guitarist.

References

Unincorporated communities in Greene County, Mississippi
Unincorporated communities in Mississippi
Census-designated places in Greene County, Mississippi